Worstead railway station is on the Bittern Line in Norfolk, England, serving the villages of Worstead and Sloley.

The station is managed by Greater Anglia, which also operates all passenger trains that call.

Services

, the typical off-peak service at Worstead is one train every two hours in each direction between Norwich and Sheringham. In peak hours, service frequency is increased to one train per hour.

External links

Ride The Bittern Line Worstead
Worstead station

Railway stations in Norfolk
DfT Category F2 stations
Former Great Eastern Railway stations
Railway stations in Great Britain opened in 1874
Greater Anglia franchise railway stations
1874 establishments in England
Worstead